Feras Kilani (born 2 April 1976) is a Palestinian-British journalist and film maker, and BBC Arabic's special correspondent.He started his media career in 1995, in the Syrian State TV in Damascus where he worked as a Director, and documentary maker until 2006, when he left to join Al Bayan in United Arab Emirates.

Kilani joined BBC World Service in 2009, during his time at the BBC, he was News Editor for 2 of BBC Arabic's flagship programmes, World at One and the Arabic version of Newsnight, Kilani led the teams managerially and editorially,  he is best known for his coverage in war-zones in the Middle East, specially reporting from Libya, Iraq and Syria

Libya Uprising coverage

Kidnapped in Libya 
On 8 March 2011, while reporting on the Libya uprising for BBC Arabic TV, Kilani was picked up at an army roadblock near Tripoli along with two BBC colleagues.
They were imprisoned, beaten and subject to mock executions at Khalat al-Farjan farm behind the Yarmouk headquarters just outside Tripoli. After 22 hours they were released.

Covering the Syrian Conflict 
Kilani covered the Syrian conflict for the BBC since it started in 2011.

In 2016 he got an exclusive access to Islamic State held city of Manbij, making him the first international journalist to get inside the city since the start of the battle to force IS out.

Mosul Battle 
In November 2016, during his coverage for the Battle of Mosul (2016–17) in Iraq, Feras Kilani and cameraman Marek Polaszewski were following soldiers going door to door to clear homes of suspected militants in the city when a car bomb exploded. Video footage showed IS launching a full attack in the confusion that follows.

Kilani, said it took three hours for the Iraqi forces to contain the attack.

Films and documentaries 
Kilani directed tens of Documentaries during his career, most of his work with Syrian State TV was not archived, but he produced many more for likes of PBS and BBC
 Awaiting return – Palestinian refugees in Syria – 2003
 Exile: Abdul Rahman Munif 's life – 2004
 The Twins: Beirut and Damascus – 2005
 Syyaf Al-Zuhour: Muhammad al-Maghut – 2006
 Libya's Torture Farms – 2012
 The fight for Justice: Nusra Front in Syria – 2013
 The Fight for Benghazi – 2016

References 

1976 births
Living people
Arab journalists
British journalists
Palestinian journalists
Arab film directors
BBC newsreaders and journalists